Cuarto milenio is a  Spanish television program directed and presented by journalist Iker Jiménez and Carmen Porter. The program has been broadcast weekly on television channel Cuatro since November 2005, being the channel's longest running program.

The program explores a wide variety of topics, usually related to mystery and enigmas, though frequently reaching afield. They include conspiracy, archaeology, history, criminology, astronomy, medicine, physics, zoology, psychology, parapsychology and ufology. It regularly feature experts in various disciplines, like psychiatrists, physicists, physicians, historians, anthropologists, criminologists, astronomers, naturalists, writers or journalists.

Cuarto Milenio has been acknowledged to have an established place on Spanish television, not only due to its longevity, but also to its following and recognizability, having been considered a television phenomenon. Alternatively, it has been criticized as pseudoscientifical, pointing to its treatment of esoteric and conspiratorial fields, and praised as a program of investigation and divulgation, standing out by its consistent presence of scientific authorities and specialists as guests.

The program has spawned two spin-offs; La mesa del coronel, a geopolitical program presented in 2019 by Col. Pedro Baños, and Horizonte, produced by the same team and ongoing since 2020.

Team 
 Iker Jiménez (direction and presentation)
 Carmen Porter (narration and co-presentation)
 Pablo Villarrubia (editorial)
 Francisco Pérez Caballero (editorial)
 Gerardo Peláez (editorial coordinator)
 Carlos Largo (editorial, also in Millennium 3)
 Javier Pérez Campos (editorial)
 Pablo Fuente (editorial)
 Guillermo León (crew and webmaster)
 Juan Villa (artistics)

Old team 
 Luis Álvarez (editorial)
 Nacho Ares (editorial)
 Santiago Camacho (editorial, also in Millennium 3)
 Alberto Granados (editorial)
 Óscar Dorian (artistics)
 Juan Jesús Vallejo (editorial)
 Francisco Contreras Gil (editorial)
 Martín Cappelletti (Sub Address and Address of Conduct)

Specials 
On May 16, 2006, Cracking the Code aired, marking the theatrical release of The Da Vinci Code. The director and presenter of Cuarto Milenio conducted a special program that addressed the secrets and controversies raised by the book. On December 25, 2006, The Exodus Decoded special aired. This program discussed the documentary and research done by Felix Golubev and Simcha Jacobovici, about a proposed Jewish exodus from Egypt.

In 2007 the program aired a special about Jesus. A special emphasis was given to the apocryphal gospels.

In July 2008 a special on Chernobyl aired.

In April 2012 they presented a special about the sinking of the RMS Titanic.

Collections 
Colección Cuarto milenio was a book-DVD collection that included best programs of the first few seasons, which were available weekly in kiosks. There was another set released in 2011.

Seasons 
Cuarto Milenio is the oldest program of Cuatro, having been broadcast continuously since the channel began service in November 2005. The best ratings for the show were in the third season (2007–2008), with an average audience share of 13.2% (897,208 viewers). During the following seasons, the show has maintained an average audience of 600,000 viewers per night, representing around 10% of the audience share, the only program on Cuatro to reach such a high percentage.

Awards
 Best divulgation program in 2006, voted in the portal ¡Vaya Tele!.
 Silver Medal for Mejor Cabecera Gráfica internacional at the «Festival Internacional de Televisión y Cine de Nueva York» 2010.
 Best investigation program at the Telemagazine Awards 2019.

Criticism
Cuarto Milenio has been criticized for endorsing pseudoscience, spreading misinformation, and trivializing real world atrocities. 

In a 2008 episode of the show, an image of a fake newspaper article from the satirical news website The Onion parodying the Stock Market, was depicted as an legitimate article from 1929.

References

External links 
 #ExpoCuartoMilenio, TV show exposition
 Official Webpage

2005 Spanish television series debuts
2000s Spanish television series
2010s Spanish television series
2020s Spanish television series
Spanish documentary television series
Mediaset España Comunicación